is a railway station in Ichikai, Tochigi Prefecture, Japan, operated by the Mooka Railway.

Lines
Sasaharada Station is a station on the Mooka Line, and is located 38.1 rail kilometers from the terminus of the line at Shimodate Station.

Station layout
Sasaharada Station has one side platform. There is no station building, but there is a small shelter built onto the platform. The station is unattended.

History
Sasaharada Station opened on 14 March 1992.

Surrounding area
Ichikai Country Club
Kanto Kokusai Country Club
Kumano Jinja

External links

  Mooka Railway Station information 

Railway stations in Tochigi Prefecture
Railway stations in Japan opened in 1992
Ichikai, Tochigi